Nephopterix scabida is a species of snout moth in the genus Nephopterix. It was described by Philipp Christoph Zeller in 1867 and is known from Egypt.

References

Moths described in 1867
Phycitini
Endemic fauna of Egypt
Moths of Africa